Oldbury Court Estate is a park in Fishponds, Bristol, about  north-east of the city centre.

It is a park of Bristol City Council, and is listed Grade II in English Heritage's Register of Historic Parks and Gardens of Special Historic Interest. The paths along the River Frome form part of the Frome Valley Walkway. There are picnic areas and a children's play park.

History 
The estate was mentioned in the Domesday book. In 1667, Robert Winstone purchased the house and land at Oldbury, previously in the Kemys family. He later bought the land on both sides of the River Frome. Thomas Graeme purchased the estate in 1799; the landscape gardener Humphry Repton advised on laying out the grounds.

Graeme died in 1820, and the estate passed to his sister Margaret, wife of Henry Vassall. In 1937, there being no male heir, Bristol Corporation bought Oldbury Court from the Vassall family, for use as a public park. The mansion house, built about 1600, was in poor condition and was later demolished.

References

Grade II listed parks and gardens in Bristol